Panorpa floridana, the Florida scorpionfly, is a species of common scorpionfly in the family Panorpidae. It is found in North America.

References

Further reading

 

Panorpidae
Articles created by Qbugbot
Insects described in 1993